Jovetia is a monotypic genus of plants in the family Rubiaceae. It contains only one currently accepted species, Jovetia humilis, endemic to Madagascar.

References

External links
photo of herbarium specimen at Missouri Botanical Garden, collected in Madagascar, Jovetia humilis

Monotypic Rubiaceae genera
Octotropideae